The 2020 Vuelta a España was the 75th edition of the Vuelta a España, one of cycling's three grand tours.

The race was originally scheduled to be held from 14 August to 6 September 2020. In April 2020, the 2020 Tour de France was rescheduled to run between the 29 August and 20 September, having been postponed in view of the COVID-19 pandemic. On 15 April, UCI announced that both the Giro d'Italia and the Vuelta would take place in autumn after the 2020 UCI Road World Championships. On 5 May, UCI announced that the postponed Giro and the Vuelta would run between 3 and 25 October and between 20 October and 8 November, respectively. 

For the first time since 1985, the race was not 21 stages long; instead, it was held in a reduced format over 18 stages.

It was also among the closest Vueltas in history with the winning margin being only +0:24. The 2011 Vuelta a España was initially closer than the 2020 edition, but due to a doping incident the margins of victory changed. As such the 2020 Vuelta had the smallest margin of victory since the 1984 Vuelta a España, which was the smallest margin of victory of any grand tour in cycling history.

Teams 

Twenty-two teams made up the field that participated in the 2020 Vuelta a España. All nineteen UCI WorldTeams were entitled, and obliged, to enter the race. Additionally, three second-tier UCI ProTeams were invited to participate in the event. The teams were announced on 8 May 2020.

The teams participating in the race were:

UCI WorldTeams

 
 
 
 
 
 
 
 
 
 
 
 
 
 
 
 
 
 
 

UCI ProTeams

Pre-race favourites 

Defending champion Primož Roglič was considered the pre-race favourite, followed by his teammate and 2017 Giro d'Italia champion Tom Dumoulin. Richard Carapaz, winner of the 2019 Giro d'Italia, was seen as one of their main challengers, alongside Enric Mas and Thibaut Pinot. Aleksandr Vlasov was also seen as a top contender, having unexpectedly abandoned the Giro d'Italia during the second stage. Other riders considered as contenders included two time former champion Chris Froome, his teammate Iván Sosa, 2009 champion Alejandro Valverde and 's Sepp Kuss.

Riders believed to be the main contenders for victories on the sprint stages were Pascal Ackermann, Sam Bennett and Jasper Philipsen.

Route and stages 

The full route of the 2020 Vuelta a España was announced on Tuesday 17 December 2019 in Madrid. The first three stages of the 2020 Vuelta were originally due to be held in the Netherlands, starting in Utrecht. This was due to be the fourth time the Vuelta has started outside Spain and the second start in the Netherlands, following the 2009 Vuelta a España. In hosting the start of the race, Utrecht was to become the first city to host stages of all three grand tours. However, on 29 April 2020, the organisers announced that the opening three stages in the Netherlands were cancelled, before confirming later that same day that the race would be shortened to 18 stages and, except for the cancelled stages, follow the exact same route as announced previously. As a result, for the first time since 1961, the race departed from the Basque Country.

Classification leadership 

The Vuelta a España has four individual classifications, for which jerseys were awarded daily to the leading rider, as well as a team competition. The primary classification is the general classification, which is calculated by adding each rider's finishing times on each stage. Time bonuses will be awarded at the end of every stage apart from the individual time trial (stage 13). The rider with the lowest cumulative time is the leader of the general classification, and wears the red jersey. The leader of the general classification at the end of the race is considered the overall winner of the Vuelta a España.

The second classification is the points classification. Riders receive points for finishing among the highest placed in a stage finish, or in intermediate sprints during the stages. The points available for each stage finish are the same regardless of the stage's type, unlike in the Tour de France and Giro d'Italia, in which wins in flat stages are worth up to 2.5 times more points than wins in mountain stages. As a result the winner of this classification is often also a contender for the overall win. The leader is identified by a green jersey.

The next classification is the mountains classification. Points are awarded to the riders that reach the summit of the most difficult climbs first. The climbs are categorized, in order of increasing difficulty, third-, second-, and first- and special-category. The leader wears a white jersey with blue polka dots.

The last of the individual classifications is the young rider classification, which is calculated by adding each rider's finishing times on each stage for each rider born on or after 1 January 1995. The rider with the lowest cumulative time is the leader of the young rider classification, and wears the white jersey.

There is also the team classification. After each stage, the times of the three highest finishers of each team are added together, and all the members of the leading team wear a red number bib on the following stage. The victory is awarded to the team with the lowest cumulative time at the end of the event.

In addition, there is one individual award: the combativity award. This award is given after each stage (excluding the individual time trial) to the rider "who displayed the most generous effort and best sporting spirit." The daily winner wears a yellow number bib the following stage. At the end of the Vuelta, a jury decides the top three riders for the “Most Combative Rider of
La Vuelta”, with a public vote deciding the victor.

 On stages 2, 11, and 14–18, Richard Carapaz, who was second in the points classification, wore the green jersey, because first placed Primož Roglič wore the red jersey as the leader of the general classification.
 On stage 3, Dan Martin, who was third in the points classification, wore the green jersey, because first placed Primož Roglič wore the red jersey as the leader of the general classification, and second placed Richard Carapaz wore the blue polka dot jersey as the leader of the mountains classification. Martin also wore the green jersey on stages 4–6 and 12 as he had moved up to second in the points classification.

Final classification standings

General classification

Points classification

Mountains classification

Young rider classification

Team classification

Notes

References

External links 

2020
2020 in Spanish sport
2020 in Portuguese sport
2020 in Spanish road cycling
2020 UCI World Tour
Cycling events postponed due to the COVID-19 pandemic
 
Vuelta a Espana
Vuelta a Espana